The World Federation of Independent Scouts (WFIS) is a non-governmental international Scouting organization with over 7 million members in 151 affiliated Scout organizations in 65 countries.  WFIS was formed in Laubach, Germany, in 1996 by Lawrie Dring, a British Scouter with the independent Baden-Powell Scouts' Association (BPSA).

The World Federation of Independent Scouts is open to any Scouting association that is not affiliated with another international organization. WFIS requires that member associations "follow, and use, Baden-Powell's original program, traditions, uniforms, morals, ethics, and structure as laid out in Baden-Powell's Scouting for Boys," amended only for "health, environmental, first-aid, and safety reasons."

The current President of the WFIS World Council is Klaus Tegeder, who was elected for a five-year term in 2007 and reelected in 2012 and 2017. He is the former President of WFIS-Europe and still leads a German Scout troop.

The World Federation of Independent Scouts has experienced strong growth, the affiliate Scout organizations collectively had an estimated 200,000 members in 3562 Scout Groups in 2010.

WFIS Worldwide Committee
The WFIS Worldwide Committee is the chief executive body of the World Federation of Independent Scouts and is composed of elected volunteers.  WFIS-Worldwide acts as an umbrella association for each of the regional Scout organisations.

Current members of the WFIS Worldwide Committee

Regional divisions
The WFIS is divided into seven regions:
 Africa
 America
 Asia
 Europe
 Middle East
 Oceania
 South East Asia

List of members
Including prospected members

WFIS Africa
5860 members in 2010

WFIS Asia
155,303 members in 2010

WFIS Europe
10,834 members in 2010

WFIS America
3643 members in 2010

WFIS South-East Asia

Jamborees and international camps

WFIS has held World Jamborees in Dinamarca 2002, Colombia 2007, and México 2011.

In addition to World Jamborees, the WFIS also regularly host regional international camps, such as Eurocamp. The following camps having taken place or are scheduled:

WFIS also hosts a Jamboree On The Internet:
 WFIS-JOTI 2010, hosted by WFIS Africa

Member Associations also regularly invite each other to their own camps, examples including:
 The Baden-Powell Scouts' Association 2007 Centenary Camp
 Jamboree 2008 (Northumberland)

International Scout Fellowship

The International Scout Fellowship is an affiliate of WFIS, but not a member.
It is open to former and current adult members of WFIS, to other adult friends of Independent Scouting who wish to contribute to independent Scouting, regardless of their Scouting backgrounds.

The ISF is governed by its World Council which is composed of representatives of each member Chapter.  It meets once a year, usually electronically.  Its day-to-day affairs are directed by the Executive Committee, which is elected by the World Council.

All positions in the ISF are staffed by volunteers.  There are no paid employees.

Uniform
The badge is that of the WFIS in reverse colours.
There is no set uniform of the ISF.  Member chapters determine their own uniforms with the badge of the ISF. Other chapters may use casual dress such as T-shirts, etc.

The emphasis of the ISF is on tangible results in supporting Independent Scouting associations, not on formalities.

See also 
 The Scouting Portal

References

External links
 WFIS Worldwide

International Scouting organizations
Non-aligned Scouting organizations
Organizations established in 1996